Robert John Eugene Davis (born March 1, 1952) is a retired professional baseball player who played eight seasons for the San Diego Padres, Toronto Blue Jays, and California Angels of Major League Baseball.

External links

Baseball Reference (Minors)
The Baseball Gauge
Pura Pelota : VPBL batting statistics
Retrosheet

1952 births
Living people
Alexandria Aces players
American expatriate baseball players in Canada
Baseball players from Oklahoma
California Angels players
Hawaii Islanders players
Leones del Caracas players
American expatriate baseball players in Venezuela
Lodi Padres players
Major League Baseball catchers
Northeastern State RiverHawks baseball players
People from Pryor Creek, Oklahoma
Salt Lake City Gulls players
San Diego Padres players
Toronto Blue Jays players
Tri-City Padres players